Joseph Xavier Murphy was an Irish politician and company director. He was elected to Dáil Éireann as an independent Teachta Dála (TD) for the Dublin County constituency at the September 1927 general election. He lost his seat at the 1932 general election.

References

Year of birth missing
Year of death missing
Independent TDs
Members of the 6th Dáil
People educated at Castleknock College
Politicians from County Dublin